Sullivan is a city that straddles the border of Franklin and Crawford counties in the U.S. state of Missouri. The population was 6,906 at the 2020 census.

History
On January 28, 1839, 120 acres were conveyed by the U.S. Government to Garretson (also spelled Garrison) P. Hardy.  Purchased according to provisions of the Act of Congress for the sale of public lands (dated April 1820).  Then in June 1848, Garretson sold the acreage to William & Mary Smith for $150. In June 1856, Stephen & Dorcas Sullivan purchased the acreage, plus an additional 49 acres from Smith for the sum of $400.  This was the future site of the original town.  On July 25, 1856, when a post office was established in present-day Sullivan, the local postmaster named the place "Mount Helicon".   This short-lived name was after an actual mountain in Greece that was the mythical sanctuary of the Muses.  In 1859, Stephen Sullivan donated ground for railroad right-of-way and built the depot himself.  The railroad named the station “Sullivan” prompting the post office to change to Sullivan.

Between 1920 and 1960 the city grew from 900 to more than 4,000 residents, making Sullivan the second fastest-growing city in the state during that time.

The Maj. Gen. William S. Harney Summer Home was listed on the National Register of Historic Places in 1984.

Geography
Sullivan is located on the Franklin-Crawford county line at the intersection of Interstate 44 and Missouri Route 185. The Meramec River flows through Meramec State Park just to the east of the city.

Government
Governed by a Mayor and six members of the Board of Aldermen and assisted by a City Administrator, the City oversees a budget of $25 million. The City of Sullivan provides services in the areas of electric distribution, water, sewer, streets, aviation, parks and recreation, engineering, economic development, solid waste collection and law enforcement with a total of 60 full-time employees. The City operates on a very solid financial basis as demonstrated in its reserves. The local tax levy of 43.39 cents and utility rates are among the lowest in the area. A two cent sales tax for general revenue, capital improvements, and transportation provides the largest revenue source.

The Board of Aldermen meets at 7:00 p.m. on the first and third Tuesday of each month. The Board relies on the aid and counsel of numerous boards and commissions, including the Planning & Zoning, Airport Board, Industrial Development Authority and Board of Adjustment that meet as needed. The Planning and Zoning Commission meets on the second Tuesday of each month at 7:00 p.m.

Demographics

As late as 1990, Sullivan had a sundown town sign warning blacks against being present in Sullivan after dark. While Missouri is 11.6% black according to the US Census definition, in the 2010 census 0.2% of the population of Sullivan was black.   In 2014, a group of 15 white schoolgirls blackened their faces for a game of powderpuff football, prompting national media coverage.  Black is one of Sullivan's school colors. A few months prior, as protests took place in Ferguson, MO after the police killing of Michael Brown, the KKK held a rally in the Sullivan area, prompting the town's mayor to write a formal denouncement of racial bigotry in the area. Attempting to overcome past prejudices, the Sullivan Chamber of Commerce selected Stefan Wehmeyer, an African American, as the community's 2017 Man of the Year. Later that year to open Life House Youth Center, a non-profit youth center that assists children with homework, learning, counseling, socializing, and sports/exercise etc. It has a game room with video and board games along with a fenced off basketball/volleyball court. Amenities and services are open to all children between the ages of 10-17 free of charge.

2020 census
As of the census of 2020, there were 6,906 people, 3,061 households, and 1,789 families living in the city. The racial makeup of the city was 92.7% White, 0.5% African American, 0.4% Native American, 0.5% Asian, 0.9% from other races, and 5.0% from two or more races. Hispanic or Latino of any race were 2.5% of the population.

There were 3,061 households, of which 21.5% had children under the age of 18 living with them, 38.8% were married couples living together, 34% had a female householder with no husband present, 20.8% had a male householder with no wife present, and 41.5% were non-families. 37.7% of all households were made up of individuals, and 13.9% had someone living alone who was 65 years of age or older. The average household size was 2.08 and the average family size was 2.66.

The median age in the city was 43.2 years. 21.5% of residents were under the age of 18; 6.3% were between the ages of 18 and 24; 23.9% were from 25 to 44; 27.1% were from 45 to 64; and 20.2% were 65 years of age or older. The gender makeup of the city was 48.4% male and 51.6% female.

2010 census
As of the census of 2010, there were 7,081 people, 2,829 households, and 1,793 families living in the city. The racial makeup of the city was 97.4% White, 0.2% African American, 0.4% Native American, 0.4% Asian, 0.6% from other races, and 1.0% from two or more races. Hispanic or Latino of any race were 2.2% of the population.

There were 2,829 households, of which 34.3% had children under the age of 18 living with them, 41.9% were married couples living together, 15.7% had a female householder with no husband present, 5.8% had a male householder with no wife present, and 36.6% were non-families. 31.0% of all households were made up of individuals, and 14.4% had someone living alone who was 65 years of age or older. The average household size was 2.44 and the average family size was 3.03.

The median age in the city was 35.6 years. 26.5% of residents were under the age of 18; 9.4% were between the ages of 18 and 24; 25.7% were from 25 to 44; 21.7% were from 45 to 64; and 16.6% were 65 years of age or older. The gender makeup of the city was 47.4% male and 52.6% female.

2000 census
As of the census of 2000, there were 6,351 people, 2,585 households, and 1,682 families living in the city. The racial makeup of the city was 98.38% White, 0.20% African American, 0.20% Native American, 0.55% Asian, 0.05% Pacific Islander, 0.20% from other races, and 0.41% from two or more races. Hispanic or Latino of any race were 1.20% of the population.

There were 2,585 households, out of which 31.6% had children under the age of 18 living with them, 48.3% were married couples living together, 12.8% had a female householder with no husband present, and 34.9% were non-families. 29.9% of all households were made up of individuals, and 15.4% had someone living alone who was 65 years of age or older. The average household size was 2.40 and the average family size was 2.97.

In the city, the population was spread over several age groups: 25.9% under the age of 18, 9.3% from 18 to 24, 27.5% from 25 to 44, 19.5% from 45 to 64, and 17.9% who were 65 years of age or older. The median age was 36 years. For every 100 females, there were 89.7 males. For every 100 females age 18 and over, there were 82.3 males.

The median income for a household in the city was $30,046, and the median income for a family was $36,260. Males had a median income of $29,817 versus $20,385 for females. The per capita income for the city was $17,518. About 6.9% of families and 11.0% of the population were below the poverty line, including 13.7% of those under age 18 and 9.8% of those age 65 or over.

Education
Public education in Sullivan is administered by Sullivan School District, which operates two elementary schools, one middle school and Sullivan High School. St. Anthony Catholic School is a private institution which operates for Pre-K through eighth grade.

Sullivan has a public library, a branch of the Scenic Regional Library system.

Notable people
 Jim Bottomley, baseball Hall of Famer
 William S. Harney, 19th Century general 
 George Hearst, U.S. Senator from California, father of publishing magnate William Randolph Hearst
 Elvin Mesger, bowler, holder of American Bowling Congress record for 800-or-better series

Historic places
 Major General William S. Harney Summer Home, Nation Register of Historic Places (1984).
 Meramec State Park Beach Area Historic District
 Meramec State Park Lookout House/Observation Tower
 Meramec State Park Pump House
 Meramec State Park Shelter House
 Historic Route 66

References

External links
 Sullivan Independent News
 City of Sullivan
 Sullivan Chamber of Commerce
 Historic maps of Sullivan in the Sanborn Maps of Missouri Collection at the University of Missouri

Cities in Crawford County, Missouri
Cities in Franklin County, Missouri
1856 establishments in Missouri
Cities in Missouri
Sundown towns in Missouri